Arturo Torres (born December 11, 1980) is an American soccer player, the first player in the history of Chivas USA of Major League Soccer.

Torres played college soccer at Loyola Marymount University from 1999 to 2002.  As a freshman, although he only started 13 of 18 games, Torres scored 16 goals and 4 assists, and was a first-team All-WCC selection.  Torres had continued success in 2000, registering 11 goals and 10 assists, and was named the WCC Co-Player of the Year.  As a junior, Torres was again a first-team All-WCC selection, after scoring 11 goals and 3 assists.  As a senior, he scored 8 goals and 13 assists, and was named to the All-WCC first team for the fourth straight year.  He finished his career at LMU with 46 goals and 22 assists.

Upon graduating, Torres was selected 19th overall by the Los Angeles Galaxy in the 2003 MLS SuperDraft and signed to a developmental contract.  In his first year, he appeared in nine games, starting three.  In 2004, he appeared in 18 games, scoring a goal and two assists. Despite the meek numbers, Chivas USA made Torres the first official player in club history, drafting him first overall in the 2004 MLS Expansion Draft.  He would go on to play 23 games for the club during the 2005 season, scoring 2 goals.

Personal life
Torres was born in the United States to Mexican parents.

References

External links 
 MLS profile

1980 births
Living people
American soccer players
Loyola Marymount Lions men's soccer players
LA Galaxy players
Chivas USA players
Bakersfield Brigade players
American sportspeople of Mexican descent
Major League Soccer players
USL League Two players
LA Galaxy draft picks
Association football defenders
People from Harbor City, Los Angeles
Soccer players from California